Adapazarı is a city in northwestern Turkey and the central district of Sakarya Province. The province itself was originally named Adapazarı as well. Adapazarı is a part of the densely populated region of the country known as the Marmara Region. In 2014, the city had a population of 462,087.

History

The history of Adapazarı dates back to 378 BC, when it was called Agrilion (Ἀγρίλιον in Greek). Ancient settlers included Phrygians, Bithynians, Cimmerians, Lydians, Greeks, and Persians, but Adapazarı got its identity from the ancient Hellenistic, Romans, and Greek Byzantine rulers. After Alexander the Great's conquests, the Persians were forced out of the region. One of the most important remains of historical significance is the Justinianus Bridge built by Byzantine Emperor Justinian in 533 AD. Historically, it was situated on the old military road from Constantinople (now Istanbul) to the east, connected in Late Antiquity by the important Sangarius Bridge and, since the end of the 19th century, by a branch line with the Anatolian railway.

In 1868, the Adapazarı Municipality was officially founded on the town called Der Seadet. A sugar factory and agricultural sugar factory attracted many migrants and accelerated the industrialization of the city. A law passed on 17 June 1954 in the Grand National Assembly saw the city separated from Kocaeli Province and made the center of its own province. The 1999 Marmara earthquake affected Adapazarı and inflicted losses in lives and damage. In the 2000 official census, the population was recorded as  158 474. By official decree, the province was renamed Sakarya after the Sakarya River which runs through it.

Economy

Adapazarı is the location of a large automobile factory owned by the Toyota Motor Corporation, as well as the Hyundai EURotem train factory. Tank Pallet 1st Main Maintenance, one of the biggest Turkish defense contractors, and Otokar, a major manufacturer of buses and military vehicles, are located in Sakarya. Other major industries in the city and its surrounding province include textile factories for silk and linen products. Agriculture and forestry also form an important part of the city's economy, with the production of tobacco, hazelnuts (fındık variety), walnut-wood, cocoons and vegetables. Adapazari is one of the most important industrial capitals of Turkey. While Turkey is a developing country, the city of Adapazari renovated its infrastructure and industry after the 17 August 1999 catastrophic earthquake which left more than 18,000 casualties behind. In memory of the earthquake municipality had built a museum of earthquake in city center.

Education and culture
The only university in the city is Sakarya University, one of the largest universities in Turkey in terms of student enrollment. Since its establishment in 1992, Sakarya University has influenced the culture of the city and transformed public life.

In addition to the university, many different institutions shape and influence the culture of the city. Adapazarı Kültür Merkezi (Adapazarı Culture Center), Ofis Sanat Merkezi (Ofis Art Center), and Sakarya Sanat Galerisi (Sakarya Art Gallery) are the main cultural institutions led by the municipality. Adapazari also hosts non-governmental cultural and educational organizations. Of them, Sakarya Bilgi Kültür Merkezi provides educational and cultural activities.

Kent Park features an authentic, picturesque reconstruction of an historic water wheel that once provided fresh drinking water from the Çark River to public spigots located every few blocks throughout the city. The original wooden water wheel, commonly known as the Çark Wheel, was maintained and refurbished to operate in one form or another from 1724 to 1955.

Sports

Adapazarı is home to Sakaryaspor. Sakaryaspor has won the Turkish Cup once and has played in the Süper Lig for 11 seasons. They were promoted again to the TFF First League in 2011, the second level in the Turkish football pyramid, as they beat Konya Şeker S.K., Bugsaşspor and Bandırmaspor consecutively in the play-off games of the TFF Second League. However they were relegated in the following season, and since 2013 they have played in the TFF Third League. Even though Sakaryaspor is not always a permanent team in the Süper Lig, they have raised many of Turkey's best players, such as Hakan Şükür, Tuncay, Oğuz Çetin, Aykut Kocaman and many more.

Climate
Adapazarı has a humid subtropical climate (Köppen: Cfa, Trewartha: Cf). Summers are hot and sometimes oppressively humid, the average maximum temperature is around 30 °C in July and August. Winters are cool and wet, the lowest average minimum temperature is slightly below 4 °C in January. Precipitation is plentiful, fairly evenly distributed year-round, and is most frequent in winter. Snowfall is somewhat common between the months of December and March, snowing for a week or two, and it can be heavy.

Notable people

Udi Hrant (1901–1978) – oud player, singer and composer of Turkish and Armenian songs
Kriton Ilyadis (1916–1980) – cinematographer
Sait Faik Abasıyanık – writer, poet
Tuncay – Bolton Wanderers and Turkey football player
Hakan Şükür – former football player
Semih Saygıner – professional carom billiards champion
Kenan Sofuoğlu – Turkish professional motorcycle racer

Sister cities

References

External links

 Provincial governorate official website
 Municipality official website

 
Populated places in Sakarya Province